Public Sculpture in Newark, New Jersey is a Multiple Property Submission of the National Register of Historic Places (NRHP) in Newark, New Jersey that was submitted in 1994. The submission consists of several public sculptures in the city created by American sculptor Gutzon Borglum during the early 1900s. The submission was accepted by the NRHP on October 28, 1994.

Objects listed on the submission 
The submission lists four extant sculptures created by Borglum between 1911 and 1926. The submission additionally lists a fifth sculpture created by Borglum, Branford Place Standard, which was either removed or destroyed at an unknown date.

See also
List of public art in Newark, New Jersey
National Register of Historic Places listings in Essex County, New Jersey

References 

History of Newark, New Jersey
National Register of Historic Places Multiple Property Submissions in New Jersey
National Register of Historic Places in Newark, New Jersey
Tourist attractions in Essex County, New Jersey
New Jersey Register of Historic Places
Public art in Newark, New Jersey